Hamadan International Airport is an airport in Hamadan, Iran . The significance of this airport is the unusual shape of the runway. The runway goes uphill for the first half and downhill the second half.

Airlines and destinations

References

Airports in Iran
Transportation in Hamadan Province
Buildings and structures in Hamadan Province
Hamadan